Praia Grande (Big Beach) is a beach situated in the civil parish of Ferragudo, municipality of Lagoa, the Portuguese Algarve.

One of many beaches to obtain the name Praia Grande, this coastal zone is located on the eastern back of Rio Arade estuary, south of the town of Ferragudo. It is just inside the mole that shields the river entrance and the port area of Portimão, and runs north to the Forte de Sao João do Arade.

Like other beaches in the western Algarve, it is bordered by cliffs from the Miocene epoch, that are rich in marine fossils.

The municipal authority services the beach with outdoor parking, security/surveillance, changing areas and showers, while commercial services include bar/restaurants, sunshade rentals and small craft hire.

References

Beaches of the Algarve
Lagoa, Algarve